Nannapat Koncharoenkai (Thai:นันท์นภัส คนเจริญไกร, born 11 September 2000) is a Thai cricketer. She played for the Thailand women's national cricket team in the 2017 Women's Cricket World Cup Qualifier in February 2017. She made her Women's Twenty20 International (WT20I) debut for Thailand on 3 June 2018, in the 2018 Women's Twenty20 Asia Cup. Following the conclusion of the tournament, she was named as the rising star of Thailand's squad by the International Cricket Council (ICC).

In November 2018, she was named in the Women's Global Development Squad, to play fixtures against Women's Big Bash League (WBBL) clubs. In August 2019, she was named in Thailand's squad for the 2019 ICC Women's World Twenty20 Qualifier tournament in Scotland.

In January 2020, Koncharoenkai was named in Thailand's squad for the 2020 ICC Women's T20 World Cup in Australia. In Thailand's first match of the tournament, against the West Indies at the WACA Ground in Perth, she anchored her team's innings with 33 runs from 48 balls, in a contest in which Thailand gave its opponents a scare before going down by seven wickets.

In November 2021, she was named as the vice-captain of Thailand's team for the 2021 Women's Cricket World Cup Qualifier tournament in Zimbabwe. She played in Thailand's first match of the tournament, on 21 November 2021 against Zimbabwe.

In October 2022, she played for Thailand in Women's Twenty20 Asia Cup.

References

External links

 

2000 births
Living people
Nannapat Koncharoenkai
Nannapat Koncharoenkai
Nannapat Koncharoenkai
Nannapat Koncharoenkai
Nannapat Koncharoenkai
Southeast Asian Games medalists in cricket
Competitors at the 2017 Southeast Asian Games
Nannapat Koncharoenkai